Penis fish may refer to:

 Urechis caupo, a species of spoon worm in North America
 Urechis unicinctus, a species of spoon worm in East Asia
 Candiru, a parasitic fish alleged to have entered a human urethra